Malthopsis is a genus of batfishes with a wide distribution in the world's oceans. In 2021, five new species were described from Australia and M. provocator was resurrected from synonymy with M. lutea.

Species
There are currently 22 recognized species in this genus:
 Malthopsis annulifera Tanaka (I), 1908
Malthopsis apis H.-C. Ho & Last, 2021
Malthopsis arrietty H.-C. Ho, 2020
Malthopsis asperata H.-C. Ho, Roberts & Shao, 2013 (Roughspine batfish)
Malthopsis austrafricana H.-C. Ho, 2013 (Southern African triangular batfish)
Malthopsis bradburyae H.-C. Ho, 2013 (Bradbury's triangular batfish)
Malthopsis bulla H.-C. Ho & Last, 2021
Malthopsis formosa H.-C. Ho & Koeda, 2019
 Malthopsis gigas H.-C. Ho & Shao, 2010 (Giant triangular batfish)
 Malthopsis gnoma Bradbury, 1998
 Malthopsis jordani Gilbert, 1905
 Malthopsis kobayashii Tanaka (I), 1916
 Malthopsis lutea Alcock, 1891 (Longnose seabat)
Malthopsis mcgroutheri H.-C. Ho & Last, 2021
Malthopsis mitrigera Gilbert & Cramer, 1897 (Twospine batfish)
Malthopsis oculata H.-C. Ho & Last, 2021
 Malthopsis parva H.-C. Ho, Roberts & Shao, 2013 (Arrowhead batfish)
Malthopsis provocator  (Longnose seabat)
 Malthopsis retifera H.-C. Ho, Prokofiev & Shao, 2009 (Reticulate triangular batfish)
Malthopsis tetrabulla H.-C. Ho & Last, 2021
Malthopsis tiarella Jordan, 1902 (Spearnose seabat)
Malthopsis velutina H.-C. Ho, 2020

References

 

Ogcocephalidae
Marine fish genera
Taxa named by Alfred William Alcock